Jean-Joseph Ader (16 October 1796 – 12 April 1859) was a 19th-century French playwright, writer and historian.

Biography 
Ader studied in a seminary of the Basque country and arrived in Paris in 1813 where he studied medicine and law.

He began his literary career by collaborating with the Diable boiteux, the Frondeur, the Pandore and the Mercure du XIXe siècle. His articles earned him many problems with the police court. In 1826, he was sentenced to five days in jail against three months required for the anonymous article Robin des bois in the Frondeur which was assigned to him. He then moved to Belgium where he founded the Constitutionnel des Pays-Bas with Pierre François Tissot, another quickly banned newspaper.

In July 1830, he was among the three hundred journalists and writers who wrote calls to insurrection to achieve the abdication of Charles X's monarchy.

His plays were given at the Théâtre de l'Odéon, the Théâtre de la Porte-Saint-Martin and the most important Parisian stages of his times.

Works 

1817: Traité du mélodrame, with Abel Hugo and Armand Malitourne
1824: Ludovic Sforce, tragedy in 5 acts
1825: Les Deux écoles, ou le Classique et le romantique, comedy in 3 acts and in verse, (with Joseph-Léonard Detcheverry
1826: Résumé de l'histoire du Béarn, de la Gascogne supérieure et des Basques
1826: Napoléon devant ses contemporains
1826: Histoire de L’expédition d’Égypte et de Syrie, with 
1826: L'Actrice, ou les Deux portraits, comedy in 1 act and in verse, with Louis Marie Fontan
1827: Le Cachemire, comedy in 1 act and in verse, with Édouard d'Anglemont
1827: Petit rocher de Cancale
1828: Les Suites d'un coup d'épée, one-act comedy in prose, with Émile Brousse 
1828: Plutarque des Pays-Bas, ou Vies des hommes illustres de ce royaume
1829: La Bossue, ou, Le Jour de La Majorit, one-act comedy in verse, with Fontan
1829: Gillette de Narbonne, ou le Mari malgré lui anecdote du XVe siècle, comédie-vaudeville in 3 acts, with Fontan and Charles Desnoyer
1830: Jeanne la Folle, ou, La Bretagne au XIIIe siècle, historical drama in 5 acts, in verse, with Fontan and Alfred de Rhéville)
1832: Le Barbier du Roi D'Aragon, with Louis Marie Fontan and Louis Alexandre Piccinni
1834: L'Angélus, opéra comique in 1 act, music by Casimir Gide
1839: L'Oncle modèle, vaudeville in 1 act
1839: Deux Normands, vaudeville in 1 act
 Folle qui se désole, romance, with Fontan and Desnoyer
 L'enfance d’Henri IV, poetry

Bibliography 
 Jean Imbert, Biographie des condamnés pour délits politiques, 1828, (p. 9-10) 
 Joseph-Marie Quérard, La littérature française contemporaine: 1827-1849, 1842, (p. 4)
 Gustave Vapereau, Dictionnaire universel des contemporains, 1870, (p. 13)
 Eugène Asse, Les petits romantiques, 1900, (p. 226)
 Les noms de famille du Sud-Ouest, 1999, (p. 20)

External links 
 Jean-Joseph Ader's grave

19th-century French dramatists and playwrights
19th-century French historians
1796 births
People from Soule
1859 deaths